Leon III was King of Abkhazia from 957 AD until 967 AD. He was the second son and successor of George II of the Anchabadze dynasty.

Life 
He succeeded in 926 as viceroy of Kartli to his older brother Constantine, the latter was blinded and castrated by George II after Constantine's unsuccessful rebellion. George proceeded to campaign against the easternmost Georgian Principality of Kakheti whose ruler Kvirike II also pretended on parts of Kartli. George and Leon were supported by his brother-in-law prince Shurta, who was also natural brother of Kvirike, who ceded Ujarma fortress to Abkhazians. Kvirike was defeated and imprisoned, and released only after he had submitted to vassalage. 

Soon Kvirike returned to offensive and incited also the rebellion in Kartli. In 957, George sent a large army under his son, Leon, but the king died amid the expedition, and Leon had to make peace with Kvirike ending his campaign inconclusively. Kvirike was forced to agree to the marriage of his son David, with the daughter of Leon.  Unfortunately, the peace did not last long, as the princess died soon and mistrust returned between the two parties. Leon attacked Kakheti again and sacked Mukhnari, Kherki and Bazaleti; In this last place he became ill and died in 967. He was succeeded by his brother Demetrius III of Abkhazia.

In 964 Leon III extended his influence to Javakheti, during his reign was built Kumurdo Cathedral.

Family 
Leon married an unknown princess:

Issue 
 Anonymous daughter, who marries David of Kakheti.

Genealogy

References

Bibliography 
Marie-Félicité Brosset, Histoire de la Géorgie depuis l'Antiquité jusqu'au XIXe siècle, v. 1–7, Saint-Pétersbourg, 1848–58, p. 285-286.

Leon 03
Leon 03